Tiit Kala (born 19 August 1954 in Tartu) is an Estonian politician. He has been member of XIV Riigikogu.

In 1974 he graduated from Palamuse State Farm Technical School of Forestry (nowadays Luua Forestry School).

2005-2009 he was the chairman of Räpina Rural Municipality Council.

Since 2005 he is a member of Estonian Conservative People's Party.

References

Living people
1954 births
Conservative People's Party of Estonia politicians
Members of the Riigikogu, 2019–2023
Politicians from Tartu